"Watch Me" is a song  by American singers Bella Thorne and Zendaya. It was produced by Ben Charles, Aaron Harmon, and Jim Wes, who also co-wrote the song for Shake It Up: Break It Down (2011), the soundtrack to the Disney Channel television series, Shake It Up. It was released as a single on June 21, 2011, through Walt Disney Records. An original version of the song, sung by Margaret Durante, is also included on the Shake It Up: Break It Down soundtrack.

It is the lead single from the soundtrack, performed by Bella Thorne and Zendaya. It peaked at number 63 on the Billboard Hot Digital Songs, and at number 86 on the Billboard Hot 100. The accompanying music video portrays Thorne and Zendaya in a building dancing with other people.

Background and composition
"Watch Me" was a single released from the soundtrack Shake It Up: Break It Down (2011), for the television series Shake It Up on Disney Channel. It was first heard on the series' first episode under the original Margaret Durante version, which premiered on November 7, 2010 in North America, seven months before the single's actual release. The girls recorded the cover song in April 2011, as multiple pictures were tweeted and news outlets reported. The original song was heard in several other episodes of Shake It Up.

Music video
Bella Thorne and Zendaya enjoy the dancing and singing in the video. The video has many cuts/close-up shots of Zendaya and Bella singing to the song. On January 17, 2015, the video reached 100 million views on Vevo, winning a Vevo Certified Award.

Story
The clip begins with Bella Thorne and Zendaya at a photo shoot, and they hear music playing. They see an abandoned warehouse and look through a broken window. Inside, there is a group of dancers dancing to the music. They then exchange their dresses for colorful dance clothes, enter the warehouse and join the group of dancers. Close-up shots of them singing the song are intercut throughout the video.

Release
The music video was released on June 17, 2011, during the series premiere of A.N.T. Farm.

Chart performance

Certifications

References 

2011 singles
2011 songs
Bella Thorne songs
Zendaya songs
Shake It Up (American TV series)
Songs from television series
Walt Disney Records singles